Evgeny Ignatov (sometimes listed as Yevgeniy Ignatov, born November 3, 1979) is a Russian sprint canoeist who has competed since 2004. He won nine medals at the ICF Canoe Sprint World Championships with five golds (C-2 200 m: 2005, 2006, 2007; C-1 4 × 200 m: 2009, 2010) and three silvers (C-2 200 m: 2009, 2010; C-2 500 m: 2009, C-4 200 m: 2007).

References
Canoe09.ca profile 

1979 births
Living people
Russian male canoeists
ICF Canoe Sprint World Championships medalists in Canadian